Remembrance of the Dead  is held annually on May 4 in the Netherlands. It commemorates all civilians and members of the armed forces of the Kingdom of the Netherlands who have died in wars or peacekeeping missions since the beginning of the Second World War.

Definition 
Since 2011 the official text of the Memorandum for Remembrance Day on 4 May is as follows:

It is organized nationally by National Committee for 4 and 5 May, but local committees still apply their own interpretation to the commemorations and also bear responsibility for that interpretation.

Description 

Until 1961 the commemoration only related to the Dutch victims of World War II. Since 1961, the victims of other military conflicts (such as the Indonesian National Revolution in Indonesia) and peacekeeping missions (such as in Lebanon or Bosnia) are remembered on May 4 as well.

Traditionally, the main ceremonies are observed in Amsterdam at the National Monument on Dam Square. This ceremony is usually attended by members of the cabinet and the royal family, military leaders, representatives of the resistance movement and other social groups. At 20:00 two minutes of silence is observed throughout the Netherlands. Public transport is stopped as well as all other traffic. Radio and TV only broadcast the ceremonies from 19:00 until 20:30. Since 4 May 1994 flags, having hung at half-staff from 18:00, are then hoisted to the music of the Wilhelmus, the Dutch national anthem. Since 2001 the new protocol says it is allowed to let the flag hang at half-staff.

The main commemorations in Amsterdam are broadcast by the public broadcasting company NOS and there are ceremonies in all Dutch cities and other places as well.  Especially notable are those at the Waalsdorpervlakte near The Hague where many Dutch resistance fighters were executed during the war, and at the war cemetery Grebbeberg, which are broadcast by the commercial broadcasting companies. In many towns, before or after the two minutes of silence, people gather around a monument, listen to speeches, and lay down flowers to remember the dead.

The next day, on May 5, people celebrate the liberation of the nation from the German occupation of 1940 to 1945.

See also
Netherlands in World War II

References

External links

 
English summary on official site

Dam Square
Articles containing video clips
Public holidays in the Netherlands
May observances
Observances in the Netherlands
Observances honoring victims of war